Bavayia nubila is a species of geckos endemic to Grande Terre in New Caledonia.

References

Bavayia
Geckos of New Caledonia
Reptiles described in 2012
Taxa named by Aaron M. Bauer
Taxa named by Ross Allen Sadlier
Taxa named by Todd R. Jackman
Taxa named by Glenn Michael Shea